Galena Island is an uninhabited island within the Canadian Arctic Archipelago in the Kitikmeot Region, Nunavut. It is located in Bathurst Inlet. Other islands in the vicinity include Lewes Island, Marcet Island, and Walrus Island.

References 

Islands of Bathurst Inlet
Uninhabited islands of Kitikmeot Region